The first conflict between Moldavia and the Ottoman Empire for which there is a historical account occurred during the reign of Alexandru cel Bun, in 1420, when the Ottomans tried to capture Chilia. The attack was unsuccessful.

In 1439, King Sigismund of Hungary argued with King Wladislaw of Poland about dividing Moldavia between their two countries. Sigismund complained that the Moldavians refused to aid him in his expeditions against the Turks, but King Wladyslaw argued that the Moldavians couldn't aid Sigismund with troops because they aided him, instead, and Sigismund had to give up on his claims. 

In 1444, Moldavia sent troops that joined King Władysław III of Varna at the Battle of Varna. The Turks had camels with them and in case of defeat, they would spill gold and silver coins on the ground in order to slacken the enemy. The Moldavians went after the camels for the money. 

Between 1451 and 1457, Moldavia was in civil turmoil and under Petru Aron, the principality paid the Porte an annual tribute of 2,000 gold coins. In 1470, during the rule of Stephen the Great, the relationship between Moldavia and the Porte became hostile, and resulted in several confrontations, most notable being the Battle of Vaslui, where the Ottomans were heavily defeated, and the Battle of Valea Albă, where Mehmed II was victorious, but was forced to retreat. In 1484, the Ottomans managed to annex Chilia and Akkerman. After the death of Stephen the Great, 1504, Moldavia fell into decline and was forced to accept vassalage for the Porte in 1512, but conflicts continued to rage until the 19th century, giving the country brief periods of independence.

Footnotes

References

 Długosz, Jan. "The Annals of Jan Długosz" 

15th-century conflicts
16th-century conflicts
Wars involving the Ottoman Empire
Ottoman period in Moldova
Ottoman period in Romania
Medieval Moldavia